Shaoqian Li is an industrial engineer and Fellow of the Institute of Electrical and Electronics Engineers (IEEE), having been so appointed in 2016 "for leadership in development of broadband wireless networks". He teaches at the University of Electronic Science & Technology of China in Sichuan, PRC.

References 

Fellow Members of the IEEE
Living people
Year of birth missing (living people)
Place of birth missing (living people)